The Senior Marshal is an honorary post in Sejm given to one of the oldest (in age) members of the body. He is nominated by the President of Poland and functions as Marshal of the Sejm until that holder of office is elected by the newly elected Sejm and Senate. Election of the marshal of the Sejm is usually the first item on the agenda for the new Sejm.

Senior Marshal of the first Sejm of the Communist Poland Franciszek Trąbalski during his short term as the Senior Marshal acted also as a head of state.

List

Third Republic

Sejm

 Zbigniew Rudnicki (SD), July 4, 1989
 Aleksander Małachowski (SP), November 25, 1991
 Aleksander Małachowski (UP), October 14, 1993
 Józef Kaleta (SLD), October 20, 1997
 Aleksander Małachowski (UP), October 19, 2001
 Józef Zych (PSL), October 19 - October 24, 2005
 Zbigniew Religa (PiS), November 5, 2007
 Józef Zych (PSL), November 8, 2011
 Kornel Morawiecki (WiS), November 12, 2015
 Antoni Macierewicz (PiS), November 12, 2019

Senate

 Stanisław Stomma (Solidarity), July 4, 1989
 Jan Tomasz Zamoyski (ZChN), November 26, 1991
 Jan Mulak (PPS), October 15, 1993
 Władysław Bartoszewski (UW), October 21, 1997
 Andrzej Wielowieyski (UW), October 20, 2001
 Kazimierz Kutz (Independent), October 20, 2005
 Ryszard Bender (PiS), November 5, 2007
 Kazimierz Kutz (Independent), November 8, 2011
 Michał Seweryński (PiS), November 12, 2015
 Barbara Borys-Damięcka (KO), November 12, 2019

See also
 Dean of the House
 Father of the House

Polish titles
Senior legislators